Greystones is a coastal town and seaside resort in County Wicklow, Ireland. The town is bordered by the Irish Sea to the east, Bray Head to the north and the Wicklow Mountains to the west. It is the second biggest town in County Wicklow (after Bray).

The town was named after a half-mile or one-kilometre stretch of grey stones between two beaches on the seafront. The harbour area and Greystones railway station are at the northern and southern ends respectively. The North Beach, which begins at the harbour, is a stony beach, and some of its length is overlooked by the southern cliffs of Bray Head, which are subject to erosion. The South Beach is a broad sandy beach about one kilometre long. It is a Blue Flag beach and receives many visitors and tourists, mainly in the summer.

In 2008, Greystones was named as the world's "most liveable community" at the LivCom Awards in China. The community received the same award again in 2021.

History 
Greystones is located south of the site of an ancient castle of the Barony of Rathdown. There was a hamlet which, like Rathdown Castle, was known as Rathdown, and which appeared on a 1712 map. This site occupied an area now known as the Grove, north of Greystones harbour, but only the ruins of a chapel, St. Crispin's Cell, survive. Greystones is a much more recent settlement and is first mentioned in Topographia Hibernica, a 1795 publication. Here it is described as a "noted fishing place four miles beyond Bray."

In the early 19th century, there were some families scattered around the harbour, Blacklion, Windgates, Killincarrig and Rathdown. Delgany was a more substantial and longer-established village. However, Greystones was put on the map with the coming of the railway in 1855, a difficult undertaking which was performed in consultation with Isambard Kingdom Brunel, the famous engineer. The railway station was built on the line dividing the properties of two landowners: the La Touche family of Bellevue House (now in ruins, near Delgany), and the Hawkins-Whitshed family of Killincarrig House (which is now Greystones Golf Club). It provided links with Bray and Dublin and left room for development on the adjoining estates.

Elizabeth Hawkins-Whitshed (better known as Lizzie Le Blond) owned the Hawkins-Whitshed estate from 1871 and she developed Ireland's first planned housing estate, an area currently known as the Burnaby. Lizzie was a trailblazing mountaineer and explorer, a photographer, an author of mountaineering books, fiction, travel writing and a filmmaker. She donated for a nominal rent the site upon which the library in Greystones is built. Her first marriage to Frederick Gustavus Burnaby was short-lived and he is only known to have visited Wicklow once/ However the area is still given his surname. An adjoining estate to that of Elizabeth Hawkins-Whitshed was owned by the La Touche Family. It was during the time William Robert La Touche owned the estate that Greystones' developed rapidly. To the north of the station, Church Road, Victoria Road and Trafalgar Road were laid out, and many houses were built. In the early 20th century, the Burnabys began to expand the town on their side of the station, and the roads and houses of the Burnaby were developed and the population grew considerably. The names of these two families remain well known today, with many roads and housing estates bearing their names.

Between 1885 and 1897, the people of Greystones campaigned for a harbour to aid the fishing industry and imports such as coal. The original pier, dock, sea wall and boat slip remained pre-2009 but had endured substantial damage. In the early 20th century, the town felt the effects of coastal erosion (which is still a major problem); the loss of fields and most of the houses on the North Beach Road, and the costly inland relocation of the railway have all resulted. In 1968, the old Kish lighthouse foundation was added to the end of the pier.

At the end of World War II, cars and petrol became widely available, allowing Greystones to gradually expand, filling in space between itself and outlying areas such as Blacklion, Killincarrig and Delgany. However, the popularity of the railway declined; its very existence being in jeopardy during the 1980s, as government cutbacks reduced the service to just a few trains per day. The 1990s brought a revival with the arrival of the electrified DART from Bray, and a much more frequent schedule.

Population and development 

Greystones has experienced a huge increase in its population since the 1970s with the construction of mainly large housing estates. The first of these periods lasted for around a decade seeing the development of estates like Hillside, Applewood Heights, Redford Park and many other smaller ones like Burnaby Park. The second boom in construction came during the Celtic Tiger period of the early 2000s which saw developments such as Charlesland (the biggest) just south of the town, which includes over 1,000 dwelling units. Following the 2008 financial crisis little development took place, evident in the difference from the 2011 to 2016 census'; an increase of only 1000. This is compared to previous increases like 2006 showing 3000–4000 in growth. Other projects such as the harbour redevelopment stalled or completely halted during this time period.

As of 2018, Greystones was experiencing a housing boom. A number of large-scale developments were taking place, mainly on the western fringes of the town, in the harbour area and around Charlesland. The main schemes included Seagreen and Waverly in Blacklion, Glenheron beside Charlesland and Marina village at the harbour. These equate collectively to over 1000 dwellings under construction. There are also multiple other similar schemes approved or pending approval. Greystones is the only town in County Wicklow with this scale of growth.

As of the 2016 census the population of Greystones town stood at 18,140 while the Greystones Municipal District Population stood at 26,323 making it the second largest town in the county after Bray.

Wicklow County Council and Greystones Municipal District Council plan for at least 24,000 by 2028 in the town itself.

Along with the housing developments, road networks and facilities have been "improved" to cater for the growth. The road between Greystones and Bray has been slightly widened and realigned. A dual carriageway link road (R774) connecting Greystones to the N11 has been completed to the south of the town. Construction of a full interchange with the N11 has also been completed. Chapel Road has been connected with Blacklion Manor Road forming a new section of wide higher capacity road from the junction at Lidl to the junction with the top of Applewood Heights, creating a complete bottleneck at Delgany village. Estates like Seagreen access from this road.

According to the 2016 census, Greystones has the largest Church of Ireland presence as a proportion of the population (8.2%) anywhere in the country, has the largest proportion of Protestants overall (10.5%), and is the least religious town in the country (18.3% 'no religion').

Transport

Road 
Greystones is accessible from the N11 Dublin-Wexford road; an interchange (Junction 11 on the N11) near Charlesland connects with the town via a dual carriageway. This quickly changes into the M11. This then joins onto the M50 (Dublin's orbital motorway) about 10 km north.

Rail 
Greystones railway station, which opened on 30 October 1855, is the southern terminus of the DART railway line, a service which connects thirty stations along Dublin's east coast. Iarnród Éireann diesel Commuter and InterCity trains also serve Greystones, linking the town with Wicklow, Arklow, Gorey, Wexford, and Rosslare Europort to the south, and Dublin's Connolly Station to the north.

Bus 
Greystones is served by the 84, 84N, 84X and 184 bus routes whilst route 702 Aircoach service starting at Charlesland links the area with Dublin Airport.

Walking 
Bray and Greystones are linked by a Cliff Walk, which follows the route of the railway line around Bray Head. The walk is 6 km long and takes approximately two hours.

Politics
Greystones is part of the Wicklow Dáil constituency and the South European Parliament constituency. Two of Wicklow's five TDs are based in Greystones; Simon Harris (FG) and Jennifer Whitmore (SD).

In local government, the Greystones local electoral area (LEA) elects six councillors to Wicklow County Council who sit as Greystones Municipal District. This LEA also includes the neighbouring villages of Delgany, Kilcoole and Newcastle Lower

The following councillors represent the Greystones local electoral area:

In 1984, Greystones was granted town commissioners. This became a town council in 2002. All town councils in Ireland were abolished in 2014.

Development

Marina 
A €300 million redevelopment scheme for the harbour was proposed by the Sispar consortium (Sispar is a joint venture consortium of Sisk and Michael Cotter's Park Developments) in a public-private partnership with Wicklow County Council. This development was a topical issue in the town, with objections revolving around the privatisation of public beachfront land without a broad public agreement. The development includes a new harbour, 341 apartments, a 230 berth marina, a new public plaza and facilities for local sporting clubs.

On the granting of planning permission, 6,210 submissions were received by An Bord Pleanála on initial plans, of which more than 6,200 were objections. Many of the objections came from outside County Wicklow, according to a spokesman for Wicklow County Council. Many objected to specifics of the plan while approving the general idea. An oral hearing was held and the board requested the developers to make certain changes which resulted in the plans being scaled down by approximately 10%. Some 3,700 objections were made on these updated plans. On 9 August 2007, the board approved the final plans, while imposing 13 conditions on construction works, including the retention of public access to the Cliff Walk during the development period, strict guidelines in relation to dust suppression, the re-use of demolition materials, and limitations on the hours of operation and noise levels. The board also overruled an earlier inspector's report, instead permitting an old unlicensed landfill to remain beside the new apartments.

In February 2010, it was announced that development of the marina would be paused indefinitely due to conditions in the Irish property market.

After the development plans stalled, the loans attached to the development were transferred to NAMA. Sispar insisted that it needed funding from NAMA to finish the project. In September 2012 it was reported that NAMA had written off €50m owed for the troubled development of Greystones Harbour. It appeared that it was not the Sispar consortium but Sisk alone that controlled the loans.

Almost all of the new harbour facilities are now in use and available to the public, while the construction of apartments is ongoing.

Sports

Association football 
The town is home the association football club Greystones United, which is based at Woodlands near the south beach. GUFC is the largest schoolboy/girl football club in the country and has in excess of 700 members. Perhaps the club's most famous alumnus is retired Irish international Paul McShane. Another club, Greystones AFC, is located at 'The Arch Field' just beside the railway bridge at the harbour. Five of their players have represented Ireland at various levels. Ian Horan, Chris Mason and Stephen McCann have represented the Irish Intermediate team and Stephen Roche and Richie O'Hanlon have represented the Irish Colleges team. The Saturday and Sunday sides both play in the top division of the Leinster Senior League.

Gaelic games 
Éire Óg Greystones GAA club is located on Mill Road, at the south end of the town. The club has recently undergone a major reconstruction which saw improvements made to the clubhouse, pitches, lighting and parking facilities.

Golf 
There are two 18-hole golf courses and a driving range within the town. Greystones Golf Club was founded in 1895 and overlooks the town, the countryside, and the Irish Sea. Charlesland Golf Club is newer, flatter, and located by the sea. There are other courses at Delgany, Glen of the Downs, Kilcoole, Druids Glen, and Bray.

Marine 
Greystones has many marine-based clubs including sailing and wind-surfing, angling, diving, rowing and Sea Scouts. Greystones rowing club, for example, was established in 1920.

Shore angling for cod and plaice at the beaches and the harbour attracts many people, especially during the summer. Swimming is popular in warmer weather, especially on the south beach.

Rugby 

Greystones RFC is a rugby union team which participates in the All-Ireland League.

Tennis 
Greystones Lawn Tennis Club has 12 outdoor floodlit courts and a clubhouse located on Mill Road at the south end of the town. It regularly hosts regional and national competitions.

Other sports 
There is a lawn bowling club located at Burnaby Park. Greystones is also home to the Greystones Mariners Baseball Club, which competes nationally and which has seen several members represent the Irish national baseball team.

Greystones Cricket (formed in 2012), practices (nets) at Greystones RFC and play their home matches at the Greystones United F.C. grounds. They have three senior men's teams and one ladies' team playing in the Leinster Cricket Union competitions, a taverners and two junior teams.

St. Kilian's Badminton Club plays in Shoreline Leisure Center on Mill Road.

Religion 

Greystones has a variety of Christian denominations in the locality, with most divisions of mainstream Christianity represented. There is a Roman Catholic, a Presbyterian, an Anglican (Church of Ireland), an Evangelical, and an Evangelical Arminian church in Greystones.

Carraig Eden Theological College is the premier Pentecostal centre for theological study and ministerial training in Ireland, offering BTh and MTh degrees in Applied Theology

The majority of residents are Roman Catholic, however, Greystones has the largest Church of Ireland presence as a proportion of the population (8.2%) anywhere in the country, has the largest proportion of Protestants overall (10.5%), and is the least religious town in the country (18.3% 'no religion'). (according to the 2016 census).

Education and research 
Greystones has eight primary schools, including several national schools, an Educate Together primary school, and an Irish-language Gaelscoil.

The town also has four secondary schools:
St. David's Holy Faith Secondary School which is a public, co-educational school.
Temple Carrig School; A Church of Ireland, co-educational secondary school which opened in 2014.
Greystones Community College, a (non-denominational) secondary school which opened in 2020
SEK-Dublin, a private international school which offers Middle Years Programme (MYP) and Diploma Programme (DP) courses. It is located in Belvedere Hall and first opened its doors in 1981.

Wicklow County Council manages a Carnegie library opposite Burnaby Park on the main street (Church Road).

Entertainment 
Greystones has a number of entertainment facilities; Charlesland Sports and Recreation Park which include a skate park, several all-weather football and basketball courts, a running track and a playground. The Whale Theatre, used for drama, dance, and concerts, is located in the town centre and is supplemented by Greystones Studios, which provide classes, performance space, practice rooms and AV studios.

Film and television 
 The Ormonde cinema in Greystones, which closed in July 2007, featured in the Father Ted episode "The Passion of St. Tibulus" and also in an episode of Custer's Last Standup.
 Greystones featured as the backdrop for some scenes in the popular BBC series Ballykissangel.
 In the 1980s, many scenes from a series called "Rose of Dublin" were filmed around the harbour area of Greystones.
 The town was commonly used in the Irish programme Glenroe.
 Parts of the movie Taffin, starring Pierce Brosnan, were filmed in Greystones.
 Greystones featured in an episode of Dream Team, a Sky One soccer soap series.
 Parts of George Gently, a 2007 British detective one-off by BBC, were filmed around the Harbour. Martin Shaw starred in the production, which is set in 1960s Britain (Northumberland). The Beach House pub was renamed 'The Mariner's Rest' for the occasion.
 The movie Yesterday's Children, starring Jane Seymour, was filmed in Greystones.

Economy 

The Greystones area is the home to several businesses, including The Happy Pear food company, Goldfish Telecom, and Smart Storage (RTÉ Dragons' Den-winning company based in nearby Newtownmountkennedy).

Greystones remains the most expensive Eircode (A63) outside of Dublin as of Q2 2021 at €495,000.

Notable people 
Greystones and its environs (including Delgany) are home to several notable people including:
 Amy Bowtell, professional tennis player
 Éamon de Buitléar, wildlife film-maker and naturalist
 Reggie Corrigan, former Ireland national rugby union team team member and Leinster player
 Paul Dunne, golfer
 Simon Harris, politician
 Andrew Hozier-Byrne, musician
 Seán Drea, former Irish Olympic rower
 Ronnie Drew of The Dubliners lived in Greystones
 Sean FitzPatrick, former chairman of Anglo Irish Bank
 George Hamilton, commentator for RTÉ television
 Ciara Kelly, broadcaster
 Paul McNaughton, former Irish international rugby player, ex Leinster manager
 Samuel Middleton, cricketer
 John L. Murray, Chief Justice of Ireland 2004–2011
 A. J. Potter, composer
 Damien Rice, musician
 Saoirse Ronan, actress
 Marten Toonder, artist, creator of Oliver B. Bumble

Town twinning 

Greystones has town twinning agreements with:

 Holyhead, Wales, United Kingdom.

Gallery

See also 
List of towns and villages in Ireland

References

External links 

 Greystones Chamber of Commerce
 Greystones Tourism
 Greystones Town Council, archived website of former authority

 
Beaches of County Wicklow
Towns and villages in County Wicklow